Francis Edward "Deacon" Waite (April 9, 1905 – July 18, 1989) was a Canadian professional ice hockey player who played 17 games in the National Hockey League with the New York Rangers during the 1930–31 season. The rest of his career, which lasted from 1921 to 1934, was spent in various minor leagues.

Career statistics

Regular season and playoffs

External links
 

1905 births
1989 deaths
Boston Tigers (CAHL) players
Canadian ice hockey centres
Cleveland Indians (IHL) players
Detroit Olympics (IHL) players
Ice hockey people from Saskatchewan
London Tecumsehs players
New York Rangers players
People from Fort Qu'Appelle
Philadelphia Arrows players
Springfield Indians (NAHL) players
Syracuse Stars (IHL) players
Vancouver Maroons players